American Nightmare (briefly known as Give Up the Ghost) is an American hardcore punk band from Boston, Massachusetts. They have released three albums, one EP and a compilation of earlier released material under the name American Nightmare.

History

Formation (1998–2004)
American Nightmare was formed when Tim Cossar and Wesley Eisold (who was then a roadie for Ten Yard Fight) met up with Azy Relph and Jesse Van Diest in 1998. They recorded a demo tape in 1999, followed by their debut release, a self-titled EP on Bridge 9 Records in 2000.  After extensive touring and line-up changes, the band recorded their second  EP, The Sun Isn't Getting Any Brighter. This was later combined with their self-titled effort to form Year One, which was released by Reflections Records in 2001 and reissued posthumously by Bridge 9.

Their debut full-length, Background Music, was recorded for Equal Vision Records in 2001 and was released to much acclaim. In 2003, the band faced a legal battle with a similarly named band from Philadelphia. The band then changed their name briefly to the initials "A.N." then to American Nothing for a brief period. After the other American Nightmare threatened to file suit again, they changed their name to Give Up the Ghost (which was intended to be the name of their second album). Their second full length, We're Down Til We're Underground released on Equal Vision, displayed the band experimenting with their sound, with longer songs that did not follow the typical hardcore songwriting formula they had adhered to in their previous releases.

Breakup and aftermath (2004–2010)
The band broke up suddenly in June 2004, a day after announcing the cancellation of a European tour. The band issued a statement which cited "health and personal reasons" for the split.  Members went on to join/form other bands such as Cold Cave, Some Girls, XO Skeletons, Ye Olde Maids, Head Automatica, Bars, and the Hope Conspiracy. Give Up the Ghost came back into the headlines in 2007 under accusations that Fall Out Boy had taken lyrics from Wes Eisold, the band's lyricist, resulting in an out-of-court settlement and a credit in the liner notes of both the multi-platinum selling From Under the Cork Tree and Infinity on High.

Reunion shows (2011–present)
After seven years of disbandment, the band reunited under their original name and performed two reunion shows in December 2011. The band performed in Revere, Massachusetts  on December 29, and in Los Angeles on December 31. Deathwish Inc. reissued the albums Background Music (2001) and We're Down Til We're Underground (2003) to coincide with the reunion dates. Since the original 2011 reunion shows, American Nightmare have played a small handful of shows almost every year. In November 2017 they announced a new album for release on February 16, 2018, through Rise Records. The first track from the self-titled album, The World Is Blue, was released December 19, 2017.

In January 2022, the band embarked on a Background Music 20th Anniversary tour, playing the album in its entirety. The tour was supported by Chemical Fix, as well as Gel on the east coast dates and Scowl on the west coast dates.

Musical style and legacy
American Nightmare have been categorised as hardcore punk, melodic hardcore and emo. Their music was a reaction against the lyrical positivity of Youth Crew revival bands that had been popular in Boston at the time like In My Eyes, Floorpunch and Bane. The band perused a more dark and nihilistic sound in comparison through the influence of The Smiths and Joy Division. Other influences include Black Flag, the Cro-Mags and Siouxsie and the Banshees. Their music often makes use of high-tempos, breakdowns, gang vocals and singalongs. They have been cited as an influence by The White Noise, Frameworks, Killing The Dream, Defeater, Touché Amoré and Dead Swans.

Discography

Studio albums 
 Background Music (2001, Equal Vision)
 We're Down Til We're Underground (2003, Equal Vision)
 American Nightmare (2018, Rise Records)

Compilations 
 Year One (2001, Bridge 9, Reflections Records)

EPs 
 American Nightmare (2000, Bridge 9)
 The Sun Isn't Getting Any Brighter (2001, Bridge 9)
 Love American (2003, Bridge 9)
 Live in London (2003, Bridge 9)
 Life Support (2020, Deathwish Inc.)
 Dedicated To The Next World (2023, Deathwish Inc.)

Compilation contributions 
 "Depression" – Black on Black: A Tribute to Black Flag  (2002, Initial)

References

External links 

Bridge 9 Records
Equal Vision Records
Interview w/ Wes Eisold (Feb. 2007)

Hardcore punk groups from Massachusetts
Musical groups established in 1999
Equal Vision Records artists
Bridge 9 Records artists
Burning Heart Records artists
1999 establishments in Massachusetts